Beth Stelling (born April 9, 1986) is an American stand-up comedian, writer, and actress. She has performed in the Netflix series The Standups and served as a writer for the HBO television series Crashing. Stelling has released two comedy albums, Sweet Beth and Simply the Beth.

Early life
Stelling was raised in Oakwood, Ohio, a suburb of Dayton. While in high school, she won the 2003 Ohio Speech and Debate Association championship in Humorous Interpretation. In 2007, she graduated from Miami University with a BA in theatre.

Stelling lived and worked in Chicago for five years until 2012, when she re-located to Los Angeles after releasing her first comedy album, Sweet Beth.

In 2014, she made her television debut on Conan, and in 2016, was named both a "Comic to Watch" by Comic magazine and a "Comedian to Watch" by Out magazine. That same year, she was featured in an episode of Outside Comedy, which premiered at the Los Angeles Film Festival.

Career
Stelling has performed on Jimmy Kimmel Live!, The Meltdown with Jonah and Kumail, @midnight, Last Call with Carson Daly, The UCB Show, The Pete Holmes Show, and We Can Fix You. In 2015, she had a special released as part of the Comedy Central series The Half Hour. Her latest comedy album, Simply the Beth, was named one of the best comedy specials of 2015 by Vulture. She also starred in Showtime's special Comedy of SXSW.

Stelling tours stand-up comedy clubs, colleges and festivals; guest starred on the Amazon Prime Video series Red Oaks; and wrote for Crashing, an HBO series from Judd Apatow starring Pete Holmes.

On August 20, 2020, her one-hour special Girl Daddy premiered on HBO Max, and in 2021, she had a recurring role on the new Peacock sitcom Rutherford Falls. It ran for two seasons.

Abuse
In 2015, Stelling revealed that she had suffered sexual and physical abuse from a former boyfriend. She said that after the two broke up, he had asked her never to speak about the abuse in order for him to maintain his reputation. Stelling posted images of her bruised limbs on Instagram, stating that they were photographs taken when the abuse took place.

Works

Comedy

Podcast

References

External links
 
 

1986 births
Living people
21st-century American comedians
21st-century American women
American stand-up comedians
American women comedians
Comedians from California
Comedians from Ohio
Miami University alumni
People from Oakwood, Montgomery County, Ohio